Carpolobia goetzei (also known as Carpolobia goetzii) is a plant species in the milkwort family (Polygalaceae). It is endemic to forested areas, wooded steppes, and areas with alluvial soil with altitudes below  in Tropical East Africa between South Sudan and Mozambique, as well as northern Madagascar.

It starts out pubescent, before losing its hairs and becoming glabrous. The leaves have been described as stiff and leathery and they end in a pointed tip. The flowers the plant produces are white, cream, or yellow and pinkish-brown after fertilization with purple, red, or bright pink honey guides on their tips. The flowers are sometimes scented.

It is eaten raw and collected between April and June. The fruit starts as lime green before turning yellow. When it is ripe, it is orange and very shiny. The fruits are not marketed commercially or cultivated by the local people but are well-liked by chimpanzees. It was first written about in 1900 in the Botanische Jahrbücher für Systematik, Pflanzengeschichte und Pflanzengeographie by Robert Gürke.

References

Polygalaceae